Sabal palmetto (SAY-bəl), also known as cabbage palm, cabbage palmetto, sabal palm, blue palmetto, Carolina palmetto, common palmetto, Garfield's tree, and swamp cabbage, is one of 15 species of palmetto palm.
It is native to the Southern United States and the West Indies.

Description
Starting at half to two-thirds the height, the tree develops into a rounded, costapalmate fan of numerous leaflets. A costapalmate leaf has a definite costa (midrib) unlike the typical palmate or fan leaf, but the leaflets are arranged radially like in a palmate leaf. It is extremely salt-tolerant and is often seen growing near both the Atlantic Ocean coast and the Gulf of Mexico coast.

Sabal palmetto "Lisa" 

In 1998, a new mutant form of S. palmetto was discovered in southwest Florida, and named as a cultivar, Sabal palmetto "Lisa". This cultivar has unusually thick and leathery, largely fused leaflets that give the palm a unique and appealing appearance. Over 60% of the seedlings have the same leaf characteristics as the parent plant and Sabal palmetto "Lisa" has been popularized in the nursery trade in Florida over the last 20 years and proven to be as resistant to heat, wind, cold, drought, and neglect as the common form while keeping its shape.

Distribution and habitat 
Sabal palmetto is native to the coastal regions of the American states of Florida, Georgia, South Carolina, and North Carolina. It is widely cultivated elsewhere in the Southeastern US. It can also be found in Cuba, Turks and Caicos, and the Bahamas.

Maintenance of the cabbage palm tree is very easy and very adaptable. The cabbage palmetto is known to tolerate drought, standing water and brackish water. Even though this palm is drought-tolerant, it thrives on regular light watering and regular feeding. It is highly tolerant of salt winds, but not saltwater flooding.

Cultivation

Sabal palmetto is a popular landscape plant in subtropical climates and used for its tolerance of salt spray and drought, and is moderately cold hardy. Because of their relatively long establishment period and prevalence on southern ranchlands, few, if any are grown from seed in nurseries. Instead, established plants are dug in the wild with small rootballs since virtually all the severed roots die and must be replaced by new roots in the new location. Most leaves are removed at this time to reduce transpiration.
Most references rate the species as hardy to USDA hardiness zone 8a. Cabbage palms have excellent hurricane resistance, but are frequently overpruned. Sabal palms normally only do well in hot and humid summer climates.

The cabbage palm is remarkably resistant to fire, floods, coastal conditions, cold, high winds, and drought. Despite this, recent mortality has been caused by Texas phoenix palm decline, a phytoplasma currently found on the west coast of Florida.

Sabal palmetto trunks appear in two different conditions, which can be confusing (see photo). When leaves die, the leaf bases typically persist for a while, creating a spiky, "basketweave" effect. These remnant leaf bases are called "bootjacks" or "boots", for short. The name stems from the "Y" shape that was reminiscent of devices used to aid individuals in removing boots. Transplanted palms are sometimes deliberately shorn of these bootjacks. Taller specimens are more likely to have lost their bootjacks and appear relatively smooth and columnar. The loss of bootjacks is a natural, if poorly understood, phenomenon, as the palm does not create a leaf abscission zone so the loss of the leaf bases results from some other physical or biological process.

Uses 
The growing heart of the new fronds, also known as the terminal bud, gives the tree its "cabbage" name, since this is extracted as a food and tastes like other undifferentiated plant meristem tissue, such as the heart of a cabbage or artichoke. It is one of several palm species that are sometimes used to make heart of palm salad. Heart of palm was commonly eaten by Native Americans. However, extracting the heart kills this species of palm, because the terminal bud is the only point from which the palm can grow, so without this bud, the palm is not able to replace old leaves and eventually dies.

The cabbage-like terminal bud has been eaten as hearts of palm. The bristles on the sheaths of young leaves have been made into scrubbing brushes. The trunks have been used as wharf piles. On June 28, 1776, Charleston patriots under William Moultrie made a fort of palmetto trunks and from it defended successfully against the British in the Revolutionary War.

The fruit is edible raw, and the seeds can be ground into flour.

Culture

The sabal palmetto is the official state tree of both Florida and South Carolina (the latter is nicknamed "The Palmetto State").

The annual football rivalry game between Clemson and South Carolina is known as the "Palmetto Bowl".

A silhouette of a palmetto (S. palmetto) appears on the official flag of the US state of South Carolina.

An image of a palmetto appears on the back of South Carolina's state quarter, which was issued in 2000.

Two images of  S. palmetto appear on the official great seal of the State of Florida and the flag of Florida.

References

External links

 United States Department of Agriculture Plants Profile for Sabal palmetto (cabbage palmetto)
 Sabal palmetto from Floridata
 Interactive Distribution Map for Sabal palmetto
 

palmetto
Halophytes
Flora of the Southern United States
Flora of the Southeastern United States
Trees of Cuba
Trees of the Bahamas
Flora of the Turks and Caicos Islands
Symbols of Florida
Symbols of South Carolina
Plants described in 1788
Garden plants of North America
Ornamental trees